Pabonka Hermitage (Pha bong kha), also written Pawangka, is a historical hermitage, today belonging to Sera Monastery, about 8 kilometres northwest of Lhasa in the Nyang bran Valley on the slopes of Mount Parasol (Dbu gdugs ri) in Tibet.

Founded by Songtsen Gampo in the 7th century, it is currently the largest and most important of the Sera hermitages and is the starting point for the “Sixth-Month Fourth-Day” (Drug pa tshe bzhi) of the Sera Mountain Circumambulation Circuit (Se ra’i ri ’khor) pilgrimage.

Footnotes

References
 Gyurme Dorje. (1999). Footprint Tibet Handbook with Bhutan. 2nd Edition. Footprint Handbooks Ltd., Bristol, England. . In USA published by NTC/Contemporary Publishing. Chicago. .
 Dowman, Keith. (1998). The Power-places of Central Tibet: The Pilgrim's Guide. Routledge & kegan Paul, London.

External links
YouTube footage of Pabonka

Buddhist hermitages in Lhasa
Sera Monastery
7th-century establishments in Tibet
Chengguan District, Lhasa